Pandit  Suresh "Bhai" Gaitonde (6 May 1932 – 27 June 2019) was an Indian tabla player. He is best known for being a major disciple of Ahmed Jan Thirakwa and leading representative of the Farukhabad tradition. He was the leading exponent of Thirakwa Shailey (baaj). Sangeet Natak Academy has stored his recording in the archives as the successor of Ustad Thirakwa.

Background
Born in Kankavli to a Gaud Saraswat Brahmin family. He later relocated with his family to Kolhapur. Gaitonde earned a diploma in electrical engineering from St. Xavier's College, Mumbai in the 1950s.

Musical Training
Pt. Gaitonde started learning tabla from his father, a doctor by profession. At Kolhapur, he studied with Sudhakar Digrajkar, Ramakant Bedagkar, Mhamulal Sangawkar, and Balubhaiya Rukadikar, who acquainted his father's medical practice.

He learnt the intricacies of Tabla under 9 different Gurus during his entire lifetime. A detailed list and what he learnt from them is available on his website give below. From 1952 to 1968, Gaitonde studied tabla with Jagannathbuwa Purohit, a noted vocalist of the Agra gharana who had studied tabla with Ahmed Jan Thirakwa. Following Purohit's death, he became a ganda-bandh disciple of Ahmed Jan Thirakwa, studying with the maestro for three years. After Thirakwa's death, Gaitonde learned from Vinayakrao Ghangrekar, a disciple of Subraimama Ankolekar. He continued studying with his gurubha, Pt. Lalji Gokhale, until the latter's death in 2002.  Noteworthy is the fact that Bhaiji was 60+ when he was learning with Pt. Lalji Gokhale. He truly believed in learning as a lifelong process and practiced it.

Legacy
Pt. Gaitonde is remembered for contributing to the status of tabla as a solo instrument. He has given mesmerizing solo performances all over the world and in major Sangeet Sammelans. He is also remembered as an extraordinary accompanist to leading musicians like Kumar Gandharva, Sharadchandra Arolkar, Bhimsen Joshi, Ram Marathe, Yeshwantbuwa Joshi, Ratnakar Pai, Rajabhau Kogje, Ram Narayan, Gajanan Buwa Joshi, and Jagannathbuwa Purohit, among others.

Students
Pt. Gaitonde taught selflessly and passionately without charging any money. His students are spread over in India as well as other countries including US, UK, Germany etc.

Some of his disciples include:
Ganda Bandh: Mahesh Kanole, Ajit Pendse, Raghvendra Kularni
Prominent disciples:  Pt. Sudhir Sansare, Sunil Jayphalkar, Rashmin Bhagwat, Shubhada Kurve, Abhay Datar, Shreepad Parkhe, Sanjeevani Hasabnis, Pandurang Dehadraya, Kishore Bandhwalkar among others. 

Besides this, he was also associated with ABGMV and various other universities. He has guided numerous students from Graduate (Visharad) to PhD levels. Several leading artists of the day have sought his inputs and guidance.

Awards and accolades
He received over 40 awards.  A detailed list with photos is available on his website. Some of the noteworthy awards were:
 Sangeet Natak Akademi Award - Government of India
 Maharashtra Rajya Sanskrutic Puraskar 2011-12 – Government of Maharashtra
 Guru Samman Arpan – Bhatkhande Music Institute Deemed University
 Bangiya  Sanskrutik Sangh Puraskar
 Nadashree – Hindusthani Sangeet Kalakar Mandali, Bangalore
 Taal Ratna Puraskar – Taal Chakra, Pune
 Chaturang Pratishthan Puraskar – Mhaiskar Foundation
 Taal Vilas – Sangeet Peeth Sur Singar Samsad, Mumbai
 Swar Sadhana Ratna – Swar Sadhana Samiti, Mumbai
 Konkan Kala Bhushan, Mumbai
 Maanad Sangeetacharya – Akhil Bharatiya Gandharva Mahavidyalaya Mandal, Mumbai
 Pt. Ram Marathe Smruti Puraskar – Thane Mahanagarpalika
 Vocational excellence Award – Rotary Club, Thane
 Certificate of Honor – Lions Club of Thane
 Taal Rishi Puraskaar – Sangwi, Pune
 Kalashree Puraskar – Kalashree Sangeet Mandal, Pune
 Sangeet Bhushan Pt. Ram Marathe Smruti Puaskar – Bharat Gayan Samaj, Pune
 Marathi Gaurav Puraskar – Mumbai
 Mridangacharya Shankarbhaiya Puraskar

See also
Alla Rakha
Zakir Hussain
Ahmed Jan Thirakwa
Nikhil Ghosh

References

External links
 His website

1932 births
2019 deaths
Indian drummers
Indian percussionists
Musicians from Mumbai
Tabla players
Tabla gharanas
Instrumental gharanas
Hindustani instrumentalists
Indian male classical musicians
Recipients of the Sangeet Natak Akademi Award